Hepatitis B vaccine is a vaccine that prevents hepatitis B. The first dose is recommended within 24 hours of birth with either two or three more doses given after that. This includes those with poor immune function such as from HIV/AIDS and those born premature. It is also recommended that health-care workers be vaccinated. In healthy people routine immunization results in more than 95% of people being protected.

Blood testing to verify that the vaccine has worked is recommended in those at high risk. Additional doses may be needed in people with poor immune function but are not necessary for most people. In those who have been exposed to the hepatitis B virus (HBV) but not immunized, hepatitis B immune globulin should be given in addition to the vaccine. The vaccine is given by injection into a muscle.

Serious side effects from the hepatitis B vaccine are very uncommon. Pain may occur at the site of injection. It is safe for use during pregnancy or while breastfeeding. It has not been linked to Guillain–Barré syndrome. The hepatitis B vaccines are produced with recombinant DNA techniques. They are available both by themselves and in combination with other vaccines.

The first hepatitis B vaccine was approved in the United States in 1981. A recombinant version came to market in 1986. It is on the World Health Organization's List of Essential Medicines. Both versions were developed by Maurice Hilleman and his team.

Medical uses
In the United States vaccination is recommended for nearly all babies at birth. Many countries routinely vaccinate infants against hepatitis B. In countries with high rates of hepatitis B infection, vaccination of newborns has not only reduced the risk of infection, but has also led to a marked reduction in liver cancer. This was reported in Taiwan where the implementation of a nationwide hepatitis B vaccination program in 1984 was associated with a decline in the incidence of childhood hepatocellular carcinoma.

In the UK, the vaccine is offered to men who have sex with men (MSM), usually as part of a sexual health check-up. A similar situation is in operation in Ireland.

In many areas, vaccination against hepatitis B is also required for all health-care and laboratory staff. Both types of the vaccine, the plasma-derived vaccine (PDV) and recombinant vaccine (RV), seems to be able to elicit similar protective anti-HBs levels.

The US Centers for Disease Control and Prevention (CDC) issued recommendations for vaccination against hepatitis B among patients with diabetes mellitus. The World Health Organization (WHO) recommends a pentavalent vaccine, combining vaccines against diphtheria, tetanus, pertussis and Haemophilus influenzae type B with the vaccine against hepatitis B. There is not yet sufficient evidence on how effective this pentavalent vaccine is in relation to the individual vaccines. A pentavalent vaccine combining vaccines against diphtheria, tetanus, pertussis, hepatitis B, and poliomyelitis is approved in the U.S. and is recommended by the Advisory Committee on Immunization Practices (ACIP).

Hepatitis B vaccination, hepatitis B immunoglobulin, and the combination of hepatitis B vaccine plus hepatitis B immunoglobulin, all are considered as preventive for babies born to mothers infected with hepatitis B virus (HBV). The combination is superior for protecting these infants. The vaccine during pregnancy is not considered to be valuable in protecting babies of the infected mothers. Hepatitis B immunoglobulin before birth has not been well studied.

Effectiveness
Studies have found that that immune memory against HepB is sustained for at least 30 years after vaccination, and protects against clinical disease and chronic HepB infection, even in cases where anti-hepatitis B surface antigen (anti-Hbs) levels decline below detectable levels. Testing to confirm successful immunization or sustained immunity is not necessary or recommended for most people, but is recommended for infants born to a mother who tests positive for  HBsAg or whose HBsAg status is not known; for healthcare and public safety workers; for immunocompromised people such as haemodialysis patients, HIV patients, haematopoietic stem cell transplant [HSCT] recipients, or people receiving chemotherapy; and for sexual partners of HBsAg-positive people.

An anti-Hbs antibody level above 100mIU/ml is deemed adequate, and occurs in about 85–90% of individuals. An antibody level between 10 and 100mIU/ml is considered a poor response, and these people should receive a single booster vaccination at this time, but do not need further retesting. People who fail to respond (anti-Hbs antibody level below 10mIU/ml) should be tested to exclude current or past hepatitis B infection, and given a repeat course of three vaccinations, followed by further retesting 1–4 months after the second course. Those who still do not respond to a second course of vaccination may respond to intradermal injection or to a high dose vaccine or to a double dose of a combined hepatitis A and B vaccine. Those who still fail to respond will require hepatitis B immunoglobulin (HBIG) if later exposed to the hepatitis B virus.

Poor responses are mostly associated with being over the age of 40 years, obesity, celiac disease, and tobacco smoking, and also in alcoholics, especially if with advanced liver disease. People who are immunosuppressed or on dialysis may not respond as well and require larger or more frequent doses of vaccine. At least one study suggests that hepatitis B vaccination is less effective in patients with HIV.

Duration of protection
It is believed that the hepatitis B vaccine provides indefinite protection. However, it was previously believed and suggested that the vaccination would only provide effective coverage of between five and seven years, but subsequently it has been appreciated that long-term immunity derives from immunological memory which outlasts the loss of antibody levels and hence subsequent testing and administration of booster doses is not required in successfully vaccinated immunocompetent individuals. Hence with the passage of time and longer experience, protection has been shown for at least 25 years in those who showed an adequate initial response to the primary course of vaccinations, and UK guidelines suggest that people who respond to the vaccine and are at risk of occupational exposure, such as for healthcare workers, a single booster is recommended five years after initial immunization.

Side effects
Serious side effects from the hepatitis B vaccine are very rare. Pain may occur at the site of injection. It is generally considered safe for use, during pregnancy or while breastfeeding. It has not been linked to Guillain–Barré syndrome.

Multiple sclerosis
Several studies have looked for an association between recombinant hepatitis B vaccine and multiple sclerosis (MS) in adults. Most studies do not support a causal relationship between hepatitis B vaccination and demyelinating diseases such as MS. A 2004 study reported a significant increase in risk within three years of vaccination. Some of these studies were criticized for methodological problems. This controversy created public misgivings about hepatitis B vaccination, and hepatitis B vaccination in children remained low in several countries. A 2006 study concluded that evidence did not support an association between hepatitis B vaccination and sudden infant death syndrome, chronic fatigue syndrome, or multiple sclerosis. A 2007 study found that the vaccination does not seem to increase the risk of a first episode of MS in childhood. Hepatitis B vaccination has not been linked to onset of autoimmune diseases in adulthood.

Usage

The following is a list of countries by the percentage of infants receiving three doses of hepatitis B vaccine as published by the World Health Organization (WHO) in 2017.

History

Preliminary work 
In 1963, the American physician/geneticist Baruch Blumberg, working at the Fox Chase Cancer Center, discovered what he called the "Australia Antigen" (HBsAg) in the serum of an Australian Aboriginal person. In 1968, this protein was found to be part of the virus that causes "serum hepatitis" (hepatitis B) by virologist Alfred Prince.

In 1976, Blumberg won the Nobel Prize in Physiology or Medicine for his work on hepatitis B (sharing it with Daniel Carleton Gajdusek for his work on kuru). Blumberg had identified Australia antigen, the important first step, and later discovered the way to make the first hepatitis B vaccine. Blumberg's vaccine was a unique approach to the production of a vaccine; that is, obtaining the immunizing antigen directly from the blood of human carriers of the virus. In October 1969, acting on behalf of the Institute for Cancer Research, they filed an application for a patent for the production of a vaccine. This patent [USP 3,636,191] was subsequently (January 1972) granted in the United States and other countries.  In 2002, Blumberg published a book, Hepatitis B: The Hunt for a Killer Virus. In the book, Blumberg wrote: “It took some time before the concept was accepted by virologists and vaccine manufacturers who were more accustomed to dealing with vaccines produced by attenuation of viruses, or the use of killed viruses produced in tissue culture, or related viruses that were non-pathogenic protective (i.e., smallpox). However, by 1971, we were able to interest Merck, which had considerable experience with vaccines."

Blood-derived vaccine 
During the next few years, a series of human and primate observations by scientists including Maurice Hilleman (who was responsible for vaccines at Merck), S. Krugman, R. Purcell, P. Maupas, and others provided additional support for the vaccine. In 1980, the results of the first field trial were published by W. Szmuness and his colleagues in New York City."

The American microbiologist/vaccinologist Maurice Hilleman at Merck used three treatments (pepsin, urea and formaldehyde) of blood serum together with rigorous filtration to yield a product that could be used as a safe vaccine. Hilleman hypothesized that he could make an HBV vaccine by injecting patients with hepatitis B surface protein. In theory, this would be very safe, as these excess surface proteins lacked infectious viral DNA. The immune system, recognizing the surface proteins as foreign, would manufacture specially shaped antibodies, custom-made to bind to, and destroy, these proteins. Then, in the future, if the patient were infected with HBV, the immune system could promptly deploy protective antibodies, destroying the viruses before they could do any harm.

Hilleman collected blood from gay men and intravenous drug users—groups known to be at risk for viral hepatitis. This was in the late 1970s, when HIV was yet unknown to medicine. In addition to the sought-after hepatitis B surface proteins, the blood samples likely contained HIV. Hilleman devised a multistep process to purify this blood so that only the hepatitis B surface proteins remained. Every known virus was killed by this process, and Hilleman was confident that the vaccine was safe.

The first large-scale trials for the blood-derived vaccine were performed on gay men, in accordance with their high-risk status. Later, Hilleman's vaccine was falsely blamed for igniting the AIDS epidemic. (See Wolf Szmuness) But, although the purified blood vaccine seemed questionable, it was determined to have indeed been free of HIV. The purification process had destroyed all viruses—including HIV. The vaccine was approved in 1981.

Recombinant vaccine 
The blood-derived hepatitis B vaccine was withdrawn from the marketplace in 1986, replaced by Maurice Hilleman's improved recombinant hepatitis B vaccine which was approved by the FDA on 23 July 1986. It was the first human vaccine produced by recombinant DNA methods. For this work, scientists at Merck & Co. collaborated with William J. Rutter and colleagues at the University of California at San Francisco, as well as Benjamin Hall and colleagues at the University of Washington. In 1981, William J. Rutter, Pablo DT Valenzuela and Edward Penhoet (UC Berkeley) co-founded the Chiron Corporation in Emeryville, California, which collaborated with Merck.

The recombinant vaccine is based on Hepatitis B surface antigen (HBsAg) gene inserted into yeast (Saccharomyces cerevisiae) cells which are free of any concerns associated with human blood products. This allows the yeast to produce only the noninfectious surface protein, without any danger of introducing actual viral DNA into the final product. The vaccine contains the adjuvant amorphous aluminum hydroxyphosphate sulfate.

In 2017, a two-dose HBV vaccine for adults, Heplisav-B gained U.S. Food and Drug Administration (FDA) approval. It uses recombinant HB surface antigen, similar to previous vaccines, but includes a novel CpG 1018 adjuvant, a 22-mer phosphorothioate-linked oligodeoxynucleotide. It was non-inferior with respect to immunogenicity.

In November 2021, Hepatitis B Vaccine (Recombinant) (Prehevbrio) was approved by the FDA.

Manufacture
The vaccine contains one of the viral envelope proteins, Hepatitis B surface antigen (HBsAg). It is produced by yeast cells, into which the gene for HBsAg has been inserted. Afterward an immune system antibody to HBsAg is established in the bloodstream. The antibody is known as anti-HBs. This antibody and immune system memory then provide immunity to hepatitis B virus (HBV) infection.

Society and culture

Legal status 
On 10 December 2020, the Committee for Medicinal Products for Human Use (CHMP) of the European Medicines Agency (EMA) adopted a positive opinion, recommending the granting of a marketing authorization for the medicinal product HeplisavB, intended for the active immunization against hepatitisB virus infection (HBV). The applicant for this medicinal product is Dynavax GmbH. It was approved for medical use in the European Union in February 2021.

On 24 February 2022, the CHMP adopted a positive opinion, recommending the granting of a marketing authorization for the medicinal product PreHevbri, intended for the active immunization against hepatitis B virus infection (HBV). The applicant for this medicinal product is VBI Vaccines B.V. PreHevbri was approved for medical use in the European Union in April 2022.

Brand names 
The common brands available are Recombivax HB (Merck), Engerix-B (GSK), Elovac B (Human Biologicals Institute, a division of Indian Immunologicals Limited), Genevac B (Serum Institute), Shanvac B, Heplisav-B, and Prehevbrio,

Twinrix (GSK) is a vaccine against hepatitis A and hepatitis B.

Pediarix is a vaccine against diphtheria, tetanus, pertussis, hepatitis B, and poliomyelitis.

Vaxelis is a vaccine against diphtheria, tetanus, pertussis, poliomyelitis, Haemophilus influenzae type B (Meningococcal Protein Conjugate), and hepatitis B.

References

Further reading

External links

 
 

Hepatitis B
Cancer vaccines
GSK plc brands
Merck & Co. brands
Recombinant proteins
Subunit vaccines
Hepatitis vaccines
World Health Organization essential medicines (vaccines)
Wikipedia medicine articles ready to translate